The Bolivia national under-17 football team represents Bolivia in international football competitions such as FIFA U-17 World Cup and South American Under-17 Football Championship.

Tournament records

FIFA U-17 World Cup

South American Under-17 Football Championship

Current squad
 The following players were called up for the Football at the 2022 Bolivarian Games.
 Match dates:''' 2–4 July 2022

References

Under
South American national under-17 association football teams